Polyptychus lapidatus is a moth of the family Sphingidae. It is found from Liberia to Ghana and Gabon.

References

Polyptychus
Moths described in 1917
Moths of Africa